The 101st Regiment of Foot (Royal Bengal Fusiliers) was an infantry regiment of the East India Company and British Army that existed from 1652 to 1881. The regiment was raised in India in 1652 by the East India Company as the company's first non-native infantry regiment. Over the following two centuries, the regiment was involved in nearly all of the East India Company's conflicts which consolidated British rule over India. The Royal Bengal Fusiliers was transferred to the command of the British Army in 1862 following the Indian Mutiny of 1857 and the end of Company rule in India. Under the Childers Reforms it amalgamated with the 104th Regiment of Foot (Bengal Fusiliers) to form the Royal Munster Fusiliers in 1881.

History

Formation and consolidation of British rule

The regiment was raised by the East India Company as a Guard of Honour in 1652. The regiment was initially involved in guarding the East India Company's factories along the Hugli River in Bengal which was India's richest province. In December 1756 it was renamed the Bengal European Regiment – "European" indicating it was composed of white soldiers, not Indian sepoys - by Robert Clive who amalgamated the existing independent companies of non-Indian troops to form the regiment.

The Mughal Empire, which had dominated India for centuries, was near collapse by the mid-18th century and the East India Company were fighting for supremacy with the growing French presence in India and becoming increasingly involved in local Indian politics. With the outbreak of the Seven Years' War, the regiment were soon fighting against the French and Mughals throughout India and saw action at the Battle of Plassey in June 1757, the Battle of Condore in December 1758 and the Siege of Masulipatam in March 1759. It also fought at the Battle of Buxar in October 1764 during the campaign against the Mughal Empire. The British victories in these battles confirmed their military supremacy in the region and transformed the East India Company from a trading company with a scattered presence in India to the ruling power of Bengal.

The regiment was renamed the 1st Bengal European Regiment, on formation of the 2nd and 3rd Bengal European Regiments, in 1765. With its ruling status in Bengal confirmed, the East India Company began to expand its influence into neighbouring regions and the regiment went to take part in an action at Rohilkhand in April 1774 during the First Rohilla War. It fought at the Battle of Sholinghur in September 1781 during the Second Anglo-Mysore War and at skirmishes around Gujarat in 1782 during the First Anglo-Maratha War. After that it took part in an action at Rohilkhand in October 1794 during the Second Rohilla War.

Early nineteenth century
The regiment went on to fight at the Battle of Deeg in November 1804 during the Second Anglo-Maratha War. With the outbreak of the Napoleonic Wars in Europe, the Royal Bengal Fusiliers would find themselves guarding Britain's interests in Asia for much of the early nineteenth century. Two companies were deployed to Macau in China, which the British had taken over from the Portuguese following the French occupation of Portugal, in September 1808 but returned to India in December 1808. A detachment went to the Dutch East Indies in 1810 and other detachments to Nepal and the Maluku Islands in 1814. The regiment saw some combat in skirmishes with the Pindaris in 1817 during the Third Anglo-Maratha War. After that it took part in operations against the Jat people in December 1825 during the Siege of Bharatpur.

The Victorian era

The regiment was deployed to Afghanistan in 1838 and saw action at the Battle of Ghazni in July 1839 during the First Anglo-Afghan War. Renamed the 1st Bengal (European) Light Infantry in 1840, it fought at the Battle of Ferozeshah in December 1845 and the Battle of Sobraon in February 1846 during the First Anglo-Sikh War. It became the 1st Bengal European Fusiliers, also referred to in contemporary official papers, with inverted word ordering, as 1st European Bengal Fusiliers, in April 1846. It was deployed to the Province of Pegu in April 1852 during the Second Anglo-Burmese War.

On the outbreak of the Indian Rebellion the order to march on Delhi was issued by Army Command in Shimla, and reached the regiment at Dagshai through Major George Ogle Jacob on 13 May 1857. After receiving the order, the regiment marched down from its rest station at Dagshai and was due to reach Umballa that evening. Jacob was mortally wounded at the Siege of Delhi on 14 September 1857. His grave at Rajpura Cemetery, Delhi states: "Sacred to the memory of Major George Ogle Jacob, 1st Bengal Fusiliers, who whilst commanding his Regiment fell mortally wounded at the storming of Delhi, on the 14th September 1857, aged 38 years. This monument is erected by his family." The regiment went on to take part in the Capture of Lucknow in March 1858. Five members of the regiment were awarded the Victoria Cross for their actions during the rebellion.

After the Crown took control of the Presidency armies in the aftermath of the Indian Rebellion, the regiment became the 1st Bengal Fusiliers in November 1859 and then the 1st Royal Bengal Fusiliers in May 1861. It was then renumbered as the 101st Regiment of Foot (Royal Bengal Fusiliers) on transfer to the British Army in September 1862. The regiment took part in the Ambela Campaign in 1863 and then embarked for England in late 1868. It was sent to Malta in October 1874 and transferred to Cyprus in July 1878 before setting sail for Halifax, Nova Scotia in November 1878.

As part of the Cardwell Reforms of the 1870s, where single-battalion regiments were linked together to share a single depot and recruiting district in the United Kingdom, the 101st was linked with the 104th Regiment of Foot (Bengal Fusiliers), and assigned to district no. 70 at Ballymullen Barracks in Tralee. On 1 July 1881 the Childers Reforms came into effect and the regiment amalgamated with the 104th Regiment of Foot (Bengal Fusiliers) to form the Royal Munster Fusiliers.

Battle honours
Battle honours awarded to the regiment were:

Victoria Crosses
Lieutenant Francis Brown, Indian Mutiny (16 November 1857)
Lieutenant Thomas Adair Butler, Indian Mutiny (9 March 1858)
Private John McGovern, Indian Mutiny (23 June 1857)
Sergeant James McGuire, Indian Mutiny (14 September 1857)
Drummer Miles Ryan, Indian Mutiny (14 September 1857)

Colonels of the Regiment
Colonels of the Regiment included:

101st Regiment of Foot (Royal Bengal Fusiliers)
1862–1873: Lt-Gen. Sir Abraham Roberts, GCB
1873–1881: Gen. Corbet Cotton

Notes

References

Further reading

External links

Honourable East India Company regiments
Military units and formations established in 1652
Infantry regiments of the British Army
Military units and formations disestablished in 1881
Bengal Presidency
1652 establishments in British India